Ron Hamilton may refer to:

Ron Hamilton (artist)  Nuu-chah-nulth artist and cultural figure 
Ron "Patch" Hamilton